Ceraticelus innominabilis is a spider in the family Linyphiidae. It is found in Alaska.

References

Linyphiidae
Endemic fauna of Alaska
Spiders of the United States
Spiders described in 1905